Asaperdina brunnea is a species of beetle in the family Cerambycidae. It was described by Pesarini and Sabbadini in 1999. It is known from China.

References

Desmiphorini
Beetles described in 1999